G 1/83, G 5/83 and G 6/83 are landmark decisions issued on 5 December 1984 by the Enlarged Board of Appeal of the European Patent Office (EPO) on the patentability of second or further medical use of a known substance or composition. They deal with patent claims directed to such second or subsequent medical use, and, as explained in reason 22 of decision G 5/83, the Enlarged Board held that patent claims directed to such substances or compositions were allowable under the European Patent Convention (EPC) when worded as purpose-limited product claims, which are also referred to as "Swiss-type use claims". These decisions are the first decisions issued by the Enlarged Board of Appeal.

Background

The European Patent Convention (EPC) is a multilateral treaty instituting the legal system according to which European patents are granted. Its version applicable before December 13, 2007 contained a provision, namely , reading as follows: 

The EPC also contains provisions regarding novelty, with  providing that "[a]n invention shall be considered to be new if it does not form part of the state of the art." Article 54(2) to (4) EPC 1973 also define what the state of the art comprises. Further,  provided the following exception: 

In other words, "Article 54(5) EPC [1973] exempts from the operation of the earlier paragraphs of that Article any substance or composition comprised in the state of the art for use in a method according to Article 52(4) EPC [1973]." Thus, besides the general concept of novelty, Article 54(5) EPC 1973 (now corresponding to ) "introduces, in respect of substances and compounds used in surgical and therapeutic treatment and in diagnostic processes carried out on humans and animals, a special concept of novelty unknown in other technical fields (T 128/82, OJ 1984, 164)".

The question then arose as to whether use claims would have to be treated any differently from method claims when it comes to Article 52(4) EPC 1973, i.e. when it comes to a claimed method or claimed use "for treatment of the human or animal body by surgery or therapy and diagnostic methods practised on the human or animal body". Another question also arose as to "the possibility of protecting second (and subsequent) medical indications by means of a claim directed to the use of a substance or composition for the manufacture of a medicament for a specified (new) therapeutic application", as Article 54(5) EPC 1973 appears to literally deal only with first medical indications.

Questions referred to the Enlarged Board of Appeal
The referrals to the Enlarged Board of Appeal lie from interlocutory decisions T 17/81, T 92/82, and T 24/82 from Technical Board of Appeal 3.3.1 (the sole Technical Board of Appeal for Chemistry at that time).

The question asked in decision T 17/81 and leading to decision G 1/83 is:

The question asked in decision T 92/82 and leading to decision G 5/83 is:

The question asked in decision T 24/82 and leading to decision G 6/83 is:

In other words, "[t]he question of law referred to the Enlarged Board relate[d] to therapeutic use claims for substances and compositions in general". The Enlarged Board also considered that "the problem of the protection of inventions of the so-called "second medical indication"" was the central question in these cases, and therefore chose "to examine all aspects of that problem".

Answers to the referred questions
The Enlarged Board of Appeal answered the question asked in decision T 17/81 as follows:

The Enlarged Board of Appeal answered the question asked in decision T 92/82 as follows:

The Enlarged Board of Appeal answered the question asked in decision T 24/82 as follows:

In summary, the Enlarged Board of Appeal held that use claims and method claims must be treated in the same manner if the purpose of the claimed use or method, respectively, is the "treatment of the human or animal body by surgery or therapy and diagnostic methods practised on the human or animal body". There is no difference in substance, these method claims and use claims are not patentable under , and no patents can be granted for those. Further, the Enlarged Board also held that novelty of a substance or composition for the manufacture of a medicament for a specified new and inventive therapeutic application was to be acknowledged by virtue of "the new therapeutic use of the medicament" regardless of whether the new therapeutic use is the first pharmaceutical use of the medicament or a second (or further) pharmaceutical use of the medicament. The Enlarged Board's decisions were thus a response to a gap, i.e. a lacuna, in the law.

Application of the Vienna Convention on the Law of Treaties
In its decision, the Enlarged Board also held that the Vienna Convention on the Law of Treaties was not in force at the time of conclusion of the European Patent Convention (EPC). Consequently, the Vienna Convention does not apply to the EPC by operation of law (ex lege). The Enlarged Board still held that due to a number of convincing precedents, the EPO should apply the rules of the Vienna Convention. More specifically, it held that Articles 31 and 32 of the Vienna Convention are each relevant to the interpretation of the EPC.

Analysis
The type of claim referred to in the answers provided by the Enlarged Board of Appeal in G 1/83, G 5/83 and G 6/83 is called a "Swiss-type claim" or "Swiss-type use claim". The EPC 2000 removed the need for Swiss-type claims. According to decision G 2/08, a claim deriving its novelty from a new therapeutic use shall no longer come as a Swiss-type claim.

Notes

References

External links
Decisions G 1/83, G 5/83 and G 6/83 of the Enlarged Board of Appeal of 5 December 1984 (OJ EPO, 1985, p. 60)
Decision G 2/83 of the Enlarged Board of Appeal of 5 December 1984
Decision G 3/83 of the Enlarged Board of Appeal of 5 December 1984
Decision G 4/83 of the Enlarged Board of Appeal of 5 December 1984
Decision G 7/83 of the Enlarged Board of Appeal of 5 December 1984
Decision T 17/81 (Nimodipin) of 30 May 1983 (referring decision)
Decision T 92/82 of 20 June 1983 (referring decision)
Decision T 24/82 of 20 June 1983 (referring decision)

G 1983 1